St Saviour's Church is a Church of England parish church in Iford, Dorset, England. It was designed by Frederic W. Lawrence and opened in 1936.

History
St Saviour's was built to serve Iford, a suburb of Bournemouth, at a time when the small settlement was undergoing rapid expansion. The population had reached 5,000 by 1934 and expansion was set to double this number over the following few years. In February 1934, the Rev. C. W. C. Browne appealed before a meeting of the Bournemouth Ruri-Decanal Conference for £10,000 to construct a church. By February 1936, £7,080 had been raised towards the £9,500 building fund, while in September only £1,000 remained to be found.

Mr. Frederic W. Lawrence of Bournemouth drew up the plans for the church which was influenced by Romanesque architecture. The foundation stone was laid on 14 August 1935 and the church was built by Mr. Frank Grigg & Sons. St Saviour's was consecrated by the Bishop of Winchester, the Right Rev. Cyril Garbett, on 22 September 1936. Described by the Bournemouth Graphic as a "most impressive ceremonial", the consecration marked the formation of Iford as a parish and St Saviour's as the parish church.

Architecture
St Saviour's is built of multi-coloured bricks, with the interior walls rendered in plaster and the roof of tiles and asphalt. It was designed to seat 462 persons and made up of a nave, north and south aisle, chancel, Lady chapel, organ chamber, choir vestry, clergy vestry, warden's room and two west porches.

in the 1994 they added an additional two story building with an upstairs and downstairs church hall. which won the Civic Trust Awards for its design. in 2012 they connected the church building to the church hall with a modern style glass panelled building called the link.

Activity in the community 
St Saviours is well known in the community for its annual Halloween alternative "Light Party" as well as its Christmas Christingle services but it is also actively aims to be an key part in the community with weekly social events and groups for people of all ages. they employ both a youth worker and a children's worker which provide weekly groups for young people in the area, but also have groups targeting over 60s, and everything in between.

References

External links
 St Saviour's Church website
 St Saviours Youth Youtube Channel

Church of England church buildings in Dorset
1936 establishments in England
Churches completed in 1936
Churches in Bournemouth
20th-century Church of England church buildings
Romanesque Revival church buildings in England